The Fender Bronco was a guitar amplifier made by Fender. It was the first Silverface amplifier introduced in 1967 to sport the modern-looking "tailless" Fender amp decal, which became a standard feature on other Fender amplifiers in the early 1970s. The Bronco was a student amp to go with the matching Bronco guitar. Bronco amplifiers were shipped as a part of the Bronco "student" package offered during that time, which also included the matching Bronco guitar, introduced that same year.  Some early Broncos used the early-mid 1960s "tailed" amp logo. The schematics and manuals listed the Bronco and the Vibro Champ as the same amp, except for the red letters and labels stamped on the control faceplate (Vibro Champs have blue labels and lettering like the rest of the Silverface amplifier models). The controls were also the same. It was discontinued in 1975.

Technical information
Fender has recently released an amplifier bearing the name "Bronco" but it has little resemblance to the original version beyond using a  speaker. The new Bronco is a completely solid state amplifier using integrated circuits to control both the preamp section as well as power amp section of the amplifier. Solid state diodes are used to rectify the input AC mains electricity going into the amp to DC. Current production Fender Bronco amplifiers use no tubes and are housed in a tweed style cabinet constructed of medium density fiberboard and covered in a diagonal tweed fabric similar in appearance to amplifiers produced by Fender in the late 1950s. New production Broncos have the controls mounted on the top-rear of the amplifier unlike the original 'Silverface' Bronco.

The original Fender Bronco uses an all-tube AB764 circuit featuring a 12AX7 dual-triode preamp tube utilizing both sections of the tube in the preamp section of the amp. A second 12AX7 tube is used for driving the vibrato function. The power tube in the original Bronco is the 6V6GTA power tube, often used by Fender in its tube amps of the era. This amp's circuitry design is commonly known as a 'single-ended, class A' amplifier. Rectification in the original Bronco is via a single 5Y3GT rectifier tube, used by Fender since the early 1950s. In fact, Fender used an earlier version of this rectifier tube in the 1940s (the 5Y3) before it was phased out by manufacturers in the early 1950s to be replaced by the more electrically robust 5Y3GT.

References

External links
 Owner's Manual for the current production solid state Fender Bronco

Instrument amplifiers
B